Always Returning is the fourth full-length studio album by British shoegazing band Engineers, released on 11 August 2014 through the Kscope label. The album is the first to feature Mark Peters on lead vocals throughout, with the rest of the band consisting of Ulrich Schnauss and Matthew Linley. It is the first release not to include vocalist Simon Phipps. The album was preceded by a single, "Fight Or Flight", released on 28 July 2014, with a second single, "A Million Voices," out on 19 January 2015.

Track listing
All songs written and composed by Engineers.

Singles
 "Fight Or Flight" (28 July 2014)
 "Fight Or Flight"
 "Drive Your Car (Instrumental)"
 "A Million Voices" (19 January 2015)
 "A Million Voices"
 "One Possible Ending"
 "Smoke and Mirrors (demo)"

Personnel

Engineers
Mark Peters: Vocals, guitars, bass and sampler on all songs. Keyboards on 8.
Ulrich Schnauss: Synths on all songs.
Matthew Linley: Drums on all songs except 3 and 9, synth on 2, organ on 3 and 8 and piano on 4, 5, 7, 9, 10.

Additional musicians
Sophie McDonnell: Vocals on all songs except 9.
Craig Sergeant: Harmonica on 10.
Maud Waret: Backing vocals on 8.
Anna Drysdale: French horn on 2 and 8.

Producers
Produced and mixed by Mark Peters at home in York except:
Ulrich's synths: produced and mixed by him at his home in London. 
Drums and piano: engineered by Elliot Ireland, recorded at Pedigree Cuts studio, London. 
Matthew's keyboards, Maud's vocals and Anna's French horn produced by him at his home in London.
Mastering by Tom Meyer at Master And Servant, Hamburg

References

External links
Always Returning announcement

2014 albums
Engineers (band) albums
Kscope albums